Elżbieta Szydłowiecka (b. 1533, d. 1562) was a Polish–Lithuanian Calvinist noblewoman heiress.

She was the youngest daughter of Court and Great Chancellor Krzysztof Szydłowiecki and Zofia Tagrowicka h. Tarnawa. She was born in 1533. She married Chancellor, Marshal and Hetman Mikołaj Krzysztof "the Black" Radziwiłł on 12 February 1548. Szydłowiecka died in 1562.

References

Bibliography
 Jerzy Kierzkowski, Kanclerz Krzysztof Szydłowiecki, t. 1, Poznań 1912, s. 308

1533 births
1562 deaths
Elzbieta
People from Szydłowiec
Radziwiłł family